Lecithocera affusa is a moth in the family Lecithoceridae. It was described by Edward Meyrick in 1923. It is found in Assam, India.

The wingspan is about 16 mm. The forewings are pale ochreous slightly speckled with grey. The discal stigmata are small and blackish grey. The hindwings are rather dark grey.

References

Moths described in 1923
affusa